The 2023 County Championship (referred to as the LV= Insurance County Championship for sponsorship reasons) will be the 123rd cricket County Championship season in England and Wales. As in 2022, Division One will have ten teams and Division Two will have eight teams. The season will begin on 6 April and scheduled to finish on 29 September 2023. Surrey are the defending champions.

Teams
The teams were split based on the finishing positions in the 2022 season. The following teams will take part in the County Championship:

Division One
 Team promoted from Division Two in 2022

Division Two
 Team relegated from Division One in 2022

Division One

April

May

June

July

September

Division Two

April

May

June

July

September

References

External links
 Division 1 at ESPN Cricinfo
 Division 2 at ESPN Cricinfo

2023
County Championship